In Greek mythology, Aegyptus or Ægyptus (/ɪˈdʒɪptəs/; Ancient Greek: Αἴγυπτος) may refer to the following related characters:

 Aegyptus, son of Zeus and Thebe of Egypt and thus, can be considered brother to the earlier Heracles. He may be the same or different with the one below.
Aegyptus, king of Egypt and son of King Belus and the naiad Achiroe.
 Aegyptus, an Egyptian prince as one of the sons of above King Aegyptus. His mother was Gorgo and thus full brother of Periphas, Oeneus, Menalces, Lampus and Idmon. In some accounts, he could be a son of Aegyptus either by Eurryroe, daughter of the river-god Nilus, or Isaie, daughter of King Agenor of Tyre. Aegyptus suffered the same fate as his other brothers, save Lynceus, when they were slain on their wedding night by their wives who obeyed the command of their father King Danaus of Libya. He married the Danaid Dioxippe, daughter of Danaus and Pieria, or the other Danaid Polyxena.

Notes

References 

Apollodorus, The Library with an English Translation by Sir James George Frazer, F.B.A., F.R.S. in 2 Volumes, Cambridge, MA, Harvard University Press; London, William Heinemann Ltd. 1921. ISBN 0-674-99135-4. Online version at the Perseus Digital Library. Greek text available from the same website.
Gaius Julius Hyginus, Fabulae from The Myths of Hyginus translated and edited by Mary Grant. University of Kansas Publications in Humanistic Studies. Online version at the Topos Text Project.

 Tzetzes, John, Book of Histories, Book VII-VIII translated by Vasiliki Dogani from the original Greek of T. Kiessling's edition of 1826. Online version at theio.com

Children of Zeus
Sons of Aegyptus
Princes in Greek mythology